, known by her stage name , is a Japanese actress and voice actress who was born in Nagoya and works for Aoni Production.

In February 2010, she received a "Merit Award" from the 4th Seiyu Awards.

Filmography

Anime

Hanako Mori in Inakappe Taishō (1970)
Mako Urashima in Mahō no Mako-chan (1970)
Jun the Swan in Gatchaman (1972)
Shishio Sarari in Jungle Kurobe (1973)
Heidi in Heidi, Girl of the Alps (1974)
Laura Ingalls in Laura, the Prairie Girl (1975)
Naida, Commander Kirika in UFO Robo Grendizer (1975)
Princess Aurora in SF Saiyūki Starzinger (1978-1979)
Francoise Arnoul/003 in Cyborg 009 (1979)
Ten in Urusei Yatsura (1981)
Akane Kimidori in Dr. Slump (1981)
Ganmo in Gu Gu Ganmo (1984)
Colonel Violet in Dragon Ball (1987)
White in Pink: Water Bandit, Rain Bandit (1990)
Korosuke in Kiteretsu Daihyakka (episodes 87 to 331) (1990)
Rei Grandmother in Sailor Moon (1992)
Celebi in Pocket Monsters the Movie: Celebi, A Timeless Encounter (2001)
Bokomon in Digimon Frontier (2002)
Kikuko (Agatha) in Pocket Monsters: Advanced Generation (2005)
Maria von Glanzreich in The Royal Tutor (2017)

Unknown date
Fuzuki Kōyama in Full Moon o Sagashite
Dante (Old) in Fullmetal Alchemist
Camelot in Fushigiboshi no Futagohime
Childhood of Kento in Future Robot Daltanious
Marina's Sister in Hans Christian Andersen's The Little Mermaid
Mirai in Queen Millennia
Sakura in Ranma ½
Charlotte in La Seine no Hoshi
Chao (Katy) in Unico
Ranmaru in Haikara-san ga Tōru
Lolo in The Adventures of Scamper the Penguin
Makiko in Tamagotchi: The Movie

Video games
Bomberman in Panic Bomber (1994)
Bomberman in Super Bomberman Panic Bomber W (1995)
Bomberman in Super Bomberman 3 (1995)
Bomberman in Super Bomberman 4 (1996)
Bomberman in Super Bomberman 5 (1997)
Bomberman Neo Bomberman (1997)
Bomberman in Bomberman 64 (1997)
White Bomber and Black Bomber in Saturn Bomberman Fight!! (1997)
Bomberman in Bomberman World (1998)
Bomber Cleric, Bomber Bishop, Bomber Cerberus, and Bomber Prince in Bomberman Wars (1998)
White Bomber and Black Bomber Bomberman Fantasy Race (1998)
Bomberman in Bomberman Party Edition (1998)
Jun the Swan in Tatsunoko vs. Capcom (2008)

Drama CDs
Gohan wo Tabeyou series 5 & 6 (Yoshie Kuga)

Dubbing 
Josie and the Pussycats (Josie McCoy)

Awards

References

External links
 

1947 births
Living people
Aoni Production voice actors
Japanese stage actresses
Japanese video game actresses
Japanese voice actresses
Voice actresses from Nagoya
20th-century Japanese actresses
21st-century Japanese actresses